The women's modern pentathlon at the 2012 Summer Olympics in London was held on 12 August. Three venues were used: the Copper Box (fencing), Aquatics Centre (swimming) and Greenwich Park (horse-riding and combined running and shooting).

Laura Asadauskaitė from Lithuania won the gold medal, breaking  an Olympic record with her final score of 5,408 points. Great Britain's Samantha Murray won silver, and fifth overall for the women's since 2000. Meanwhile, Yane Marques became Brazil's first Olympic medalist in modern pentathlon, taking the bronze. Belarus' Anastasiya Prokopenko set an Olympic record for the combined running and shooting event, with a time of 11:06.00, but finished only in sixth place.

Competition format
The modern pentathlon consisted of five events, all held on the same day. The format was slightly different from the typical modern pentathlon, with two events combined at the end.

 Fencing: A round-robin, one-touch épée competition. Score was based on winning percentage.
 Swimming: A 200 m freestyle race. Score was based on time.
 Riding: A show jumping competition. Score based on penalties for fallen bars, refusals, falls, and being over the time limit.
 Combined running/shooting: A 3 km run with pistol shooting (the athlete must hit five targets in 70 seconds) every kilometre. Starts were staggered based on points from the previous three events.

Schedule
All times are British Summer Time (UTC+1)

Results
Thirty-six athletes participated.

Records
For the first time in Olympic history, the women's modern pentathlon has broken multiple Olympic records in the every sporting discipline, with the exception of fencing and horse-riding.

References

Modern pentathlon at the 2012 Summer Olympics
2012 in women's sport
Women's events at the 2012 Summer Olympics